Vibrio virus K139 is a bacteriophage (a virus that infects bacteria) of the family Myoviridae, genus Longwoodvirus.

References 

Myoviridae